Sundara Swapnagalu is a 1986 Indian Kannada-language drama film directed by K. Balachander and written by Maniyan. The film featured Sridhar in the main role, along with Ramesh Aravind, making his on-screen debuts. Actress Tara, K. S. Ashwath and Vishwa Vijeth featured in the supporting roles. Produced by V. Natarajan of Kavithalaya Productions, the film had score and soundtrack were composed by Vijaya Bhaskar. The film was a remake of the director's own Tamil film Sollathaan Ninaikkiren.

This became the debut movie of Ramesh though he had shot first for another movie - Mouna Geethe which went on to be released shortly later. Ramesh earned acclaimed for reprising the role of Kamal Hassan in his debut movie itself. Impressed by his performance, Balachander went on to introduce Ramesh in both Tamil and Telugu - bringing a distinct trait of having been introduced in three different languages by the same director.

Plot

Cast 
 Sridhar 
 Ramesh Aravind 
 Tara
 Vishwa Vijeth
 Chitra
 Devilalitha
 Kuyili
 Janani
 K. S. Ashwath
 B. Jayashree
 Somashekar Rao
 Mysore Lokesh

Soundtrack 
The music was composed by Vijaya Bhaskar, with lyrics by R. N. Jayagopal. Audio was brought out by Lahari Music company.

References

External links 
 

1980s Kannada-language films
1986 drama films
1986 films
Films directed by K. Balachander
Films scored by Vijaya Bhaskar
Films with screenplays by K. Balachander
Indian drama films
Kannada remakes of Tamil films